Paul Monash (June 14, 1917 – January 14, 2003) was an American television and film producer and screenwriter.

Life and career

Paul Monash was born in Harlem, New York, in 1917, and grew up in The Bronx. His mother, Rhoda Melrose, acted in silent films. Monash earned a bachelor's degree in journalism from the University of Wisconsin–Madison and a master's degree in education from Columbia University.<ref>"Paul Monash, 85, producer of television and film classics," The Star-Ledger, January 16, 2003</ref> An aspiring novelist, he rode the rails across the United States, served in the merchant marine, lived as an expatriate in Paris and studied art.

Monash won early acclaim for his writing for television, including his work on the pioneer anthology series Studio One, Suspense and Playhouse 90. He received an Emmy Award for "The Lonely Wizard," a 1957 episode of Schlitz Playhouse of Stars that starred Rod Steiger. Monash wrote and produced the pilot for the TV series The Untouchables (1959), shown in two parts on Desilu Playhouse and edited as a feature film for distribution in Europe. He also wrote some episodes of the 1958–1959 NBC docudrama about the Cold War, Behind Closed Doors, hosted and starring Bruce Gordon.

After the success of The Untouchables, Monash was asked to create Peyton Place (1964–1969), an ABC-TV series that was the first prime-time serialized drama on American television.

His film production credits include Butch Cassidy and the Sundance Kid (1969), Slaughterhouse-Five (1972), The Front Page (1974) and Carrie (1976). Monash produced the feature film The Friends of Eddie Coyle (1973), a dark, critically acclaimed crime drama starring Robert Mitchum, and also adapted the George V. Higgins novel for the screen.

Monash wrote the 1979 CBS-TV adaption of All Quiet on the Western Front, a Hallmark Hall of Fame production that received a Golden Globe Award for Best Motion Picture Made for Television. His screenplay for the HBO film Stalin (1992) was nominated for an Emmy Award; and Monash received the Humanitas Prize for his teleplay for the TNT film George Wallace (1997).

His final credit was the A&E Network original film, The Golden Spiders: A Nero Wolfe Mystery (2000), a critically praised adaption of the Rex Stout novel. The TV movie first aired March 5, 2000, the same day that the Writers Guild of America, west, presented the 83-year-old Monash with the Paddy Chayefsky award for lifetime achievement. It is the guild's highest award, given to writers who have "advanced the literature of television through the years."

Paul Monash died of pancreatic cancer January 14, 2003, in Los Angeles.

Filmography

WriterForeign Intrigue (TV)
"Berlin to Frankfurt" (1952)
"The Radio Message" (1952)
"Sun Lamp" (1952)
" The Living Corpse" (1952)
"The Perfect Plan" (1952)Atom Squad (1953)Suspense (TV)
"Needle in a Haystack" (1953)
"The Man Who Wouldn't Talk" (1954)Operation Manhunt (1954)Danger (TV)
"Last Stop Before Albany" (1953)
"Return Flight" (1953)
"Five Minutes to Die" (1953)
"Cornered" (1954)
"Menace from the East (1954)Studio One (TV)
"Stan, the Killer" (1952)
"Blow Up at Cortland" (1955)Climax! (TV)
"Sailor on Horseback" (1955)
"Bailout at 43,000 Feet" (1955)Big Town (TV)
"Hung Jury" (1956)Colonel March of Scotland Yard (TV)
"The Sorcerer" (1956)
"The Strange Event at Roman Fall" (1956)
"The Deadly Gift" (1956)Studio 57 (TV)
" Outpost" (1956)General Electric Theater (TV)
"The Shadow Outside" (1956)Assignment Foreign Legion (TV)
"The Stripes of Sergeant Schweiger" (1956)
"The Sword of Truth" (1956)
"The White Kepi" (1957)
"The Testimonial of a Soldier" (1957)Kraft Television Theatre (TV)
"Boy in a Cage" (1956)
"The Singin' Idol" (1957)Bailout at 43,000 (1957)Schlitz Playhouse of Stars (TV)
"The Lonely Wizard" (1957) (Emmy Award)Sing, Boy, Sing (1958) (story "The Singin' Idol")The Safecracker (1958)Touch of Evil (1958) (uncredited)Playhouse 90 (TV)
"The Country Husband" (1956)
"The Helen Morgan Story" (1957)
"The Death of Manolete" (1957)
"Nightmare at Ground Zero" (1958)The Gun Runners (1958)Behind Closed Doors (TV)
"The Cape Canaveral Story" (1958)Pursuit (TV)
"The Silent Night" (1958)Goodyear Theatre (TV)
"The Guy in Ward 4" (1958)
"Afternoon of the Beast" (1959)The Scarface Mob (TV) (1959) (pilot for The Untouchables)Westinghouse Desilu Playhouse (TV)
Debut (1958)
"The Untouchables: Part 1" (1959)
"The Untouchables: Part 2" (1959)The Crimebusters (1961)The Asphalt Jungle (TV)
"The Lady and the Lawyer" (1961)
"The Fighter" (1961)
"The Kidnapping" (1961)The Lawbreakers (1961)Cain's Hundred (TV) (1961–1962)Twelve O'Clock High (TV)
"Follow the Leader" (1964) (uncredited)Braddock (TV) (1968)Judd, for the Defense (TV) (1967–1969)Peyton Place (TV) (1964–1969)The Friends of Eddie Coyle (1973)All Quiet on the Western Front (TV) (1979)
Salem's Lot (TV) (1979)
V (TV)
" Liberation Day" (1984)
Stalin (TV) (1992)
Killer Rules (TV) (1993)
Kingfish: A Story of Huey P. Long (TV) (1995)
George Wallace (TV) (1997)
Rescuers: Stories of Courage – Two Couples (TV) (1998) (segment "Aart and Johtje Vos")
The Golden Spiders: A Nero Wolfe Mystery (TV) (2000)

Producer

Cain's Hundred (TV) (1961–1962) (executive producer)
Braddock (TV) (1968)
Deadfall (1968)
Judd, for the Defense (TV) (1967–1969) (executive producer)
Peyton Place (TV) (1964–1969) (executive producer)
Butch Cassidy and the Sundance Kid (1969) (executive producer)
Slaughterhouse-Five (1972)
The Friends of Eddie Coyle (1973)

The Front Page (1974)
The Trial of Chaplain Jensen (TV) (1975) (executive producer)
Carrie (1976)
The Day the Loving Stopped (TV) (1981) (executive producer)
Child Bride of Short Creek (TV) (1981)
Big Trouble in Little China (1986) (executive producer)
The Rage: Carrie 2 (1999)
Carrie (TV) (2002) (consulting producer)

Awards
1958, Winner, Emmy AwardSchlitz Playhouse of Stars (episode "The Lonely Wizard")Best Teleplay Writing – Half Hour or LessAcademy of Television Arts & Sciences
1980, Nominee, Edgar AwardSalem's LotBest Television Feature or MiniseriesMystery Writers of America
1993, Nominee, Emmy AwardStalinOutstanding Individual Achievement in Writing in a Miniseries or a SpecialAcademy of Television Arts & Sciences
1997, Nominee, CableACE AwardGeorge Wallace Writing a Movie or MiniseriesShared with Marshall FradyNational Cable Television Association
1998, Winner, Humanitas PrizeGeorge WallacePBS/Cable Category Shared with Marshall Frady
1998, Nominee, WGA AwardGeorge WallaceAdapted Long Form Shared with Marshall FradyWriters Guild of America
1999, Nominee, Humanitas PrizeRescuers: Stories of Courage – Two Couples (segment "Aart and Johtje Vos")60 Minute CategoryShared with Cy Chermak and Francine Carroll
2000, Winner, Paddy Chayefsky Laurel Award for Lifetime AchievementWriters Guild of America, west

References

External links
 
Paul Monash, Writer, producer (obituary); Variety, January 15, 2003
Paul Monash, 85, Television Screenwriter (obituary); The New York Times, January 16, 2003
Paul Monash, Film Producer and Screenwriter (obituary); The Independent (London), January 17, 2003

1917 births
2003 deaths
American male screenwriters
American television writers
American film producers
American television producers
Emmy Award winners
University of Wisconsin–Madison School of Journalism & Mass Communication alumni
American male television writers
Teachers College, Columbia University alumni
20th-century American male writers
20th-century American screenwriters
Deaths from pancreatic cancer
Deaths from cancer in California